Netherlands national cerebral palsy football team is the national cerebral football team for the Netherlands that represents the team in international competitions.  The team has participated in every Paralympic Games since the sport made its debut in 1988, winning gold medals in 1988, 1992 and 1996.  At the most recent IFCPF World Championships in 2015, they finished fourth.  They had first-place finishes at the World Championships in 1986, 1990 and 1994.

Background 
Koninklijke Nederlandse Voetbalbond (KNVB) manages the national team. With international cerebral palsy football starting in 1978, the Netherlands quickly emerged as one of the most dominant teams in the world during the 1980s.

In 2012, the team was coached by Marcel Geestman. While the Netherlands was active in participating on the Paralympic and World Championship level by 2016, the country did not have a national championships to support national team player development. In 2016, after getting an endorsement by the World AntiDoping Agency (WADA), the IFCPF Anti-Doping Code was formally amended to allow for out of competition testing.  This was done through a WADA approved Whereabouts Programme managed through ADAMS. Drawing from players in a  Registered Testing Pool, players from this country were included ahead of the 2016 Summer Paralympics in Rio.

Ranking 
In 2016, the Netherlands was ranked fourth in the world by the IFCPF. They maintained this ranking in November 2014 and August 2013. Prior to this, in September 2012 and July 2011, the team was ranked number fifth in the world.

Players 
There have been a number of players for the Dutch squad.

Results 

The Netherlands has participated in a number of international tournaments.

At the Football 7-a-side International Tournament in Portugal in 2011, the Netherlands beat Canada 4 - 0 and 3 - 1. In 2013, the team participated in the Football Development Tournament in Vienna. The tournament was organized by Austrian Disability Sports Federation (OBSV), with Germany, the Netherlands, Austria and Singapore all participating.  The Netherlands finished third at the 2016 Pre-Paralympic Tournament in Salou, Spain after beating Great Britain 3 - 2 in the bronze medal game.

IFCPF World Championships 
Netherlands has participated in the IFCPF World Championships.

Paralympic Games 

The Netherlands has participated in 7-a-side football at the Paralympic Games.

Paralympic Results

References 

Cerebral Palsy
Netherlands at the Paralympics
National cerebral palsy football teams
Football 7-a-side teams at the 2016 Summer Paralympics
Football 7-a-side teams at the 2012 Summer Paralympics
Football 7-a-side teams at the 2008 Summer Paralympics
Football 7-a-side teams at the 2004 Summer Paralympics
Football 7-a-side teams at the 2000 Summer Paralympics
Football 7-a-side teams at the 1996 Summer Paralympics
Football 7-a-side teams at the 1992 Summer Paralympics
Football 7-a-side teams at the 1988 Summer Paralympics